Krasnogorsky District (Krasnogorsk joros) is an administrative and municipal district (raion), one of the twenty-five in the Udmurt Republic, Russia. It is located in the northwest of the republic. Its administrative center is the rural locality (a selo) of Krasnogorskoye. Population:  12,219 (2002 Census);  The population of Krasnogorskoye accounts for 42.8% of the district's total population.

References

Sources

Districts of Udmurtia